Callipielus arenosus is a species of moth of the family Hepialidae. It is known from Argentina and Chile.

References

External links
Hepialidae genera

Moths described in 1882
Hepialidae